Tatenda Tsumba (born 12 November 1991) is a male Zimbabwean sprinter. He competed in the 200 metres at the 2015 World Championships.

International competitions

1Disqualified in the semifinal

Personal bests

Outdoor
100 metres – 10.17	(+1.3 m/s, Chula Vista 2016)
200 metres – 20.44 (+1.3 m/s, Chula Vista 2016)
Indoor
60 metres – 6.71 (Provo 2017)
200 metres – 21.16 (Colorado Springs 2016)

References

External links

 BYU Cougars bio

1991 births
Living people
Zimbabwean male sprinters
Alumni of Eaglesvale High School
Sportspeople from Harare
World Athletics Championships athletes for Zimbabwe
Athletes (track and field) at the 2016 Summer Olympics
Olympic athletes of Zimbabwe
Athletes (track and field) at the 2019 African Games
African Games competitors for Zimbabwe
BYU Cougars men's track and field athletes